Hoopii Falls are a series of waterfalls along the Kapaa Stream, located near the Kapaa town on the east shore of Kauai, Hawaii. The falls were used as a filming location in Jurassic Park (1993) for the fictional site of the "Mano de Dios Amber Mine" in the Dominican Republic.

References

Waterfalls of Kauai